Danielle Scott may refer to:

Danielle Scott (freestyle skier) (born 1990), Australian freestyle skier
Danielle Scott (tennis) (born 1970), American tennis player
Danielle Scott-Arruda (born 1972), American volleyball player